Fernando Solana Morales (February 8, 1931 – March 23, 2016) was a Mexican diplomat, politician and businessman. He served as the Mexican Secretary of Public Education, of Commerce and of Foreign Affairs.

Biography
Born in Mexico City, Fernando Solana graduated from the National Autonomous University of Mexico, where has been a professor in Economics, Philosophy, and Political Sciences. He has also served as Secretary General of the University.

He began his public service career after he was appointed as Secretary of Commerce by president José López Portillo in 1976. Less than one year later, he was appointed Secretary of Education, a position that he retained to the end of the López Portillo administration in 1982. That same year, the new president Miguel de la Madrid named him General Director of BANAMEX, the largest private bank in Mexico that had just been nationalized by the previous government, he remained in this charge until 1988 when Carlos Salinas de Gortari named him as Secretary of Foreign Affairs. From 1994 to 2000 he was senator representing the Federal District and chair the senatorial commission on International Affairs. Today he chairs the board of the Mexican Council on Foreign Affairs a non governmental organization, with some 500 independent members that include businessmen, diplomats, professors and people link with the international activities of Mexico. He is also member of the board of some of the largest Mexican corporations, the Institute of the Americas in California, the Mexican American Foundation for Science, Euro America Foundation in Madrid, Canning House in London and president of Solana Consultores, a business consultancy firm.

References

1931 births
2016 deaths
Institutional Revolutionary Party politicians
Mexican diplomats
Members of the Senate of the Republic (Mexico)
People from Mexico City
Mexican Secretaries of Foreign Affairs
Mexican Secretaries of Education
20th-century Mexican politicians